The Wisconsin Badgers college football team competes as part of the National Collegiate Athletic Association (NCAA) Division I Football Bowl Subdivision, representing the University of Wisconsin–Madison in the West Division of the Big Ten Conference. Wisconsin was one of seven original founding members of the Big Ten Conference, then known as the Western Conference, in 1896. Wisconsin has played their home games at Camp Randall Stadium in Madison, Wisconsin since 1917. 

Since the team's first season in 1889, the Badgers have participated in more than 1,100 officially sanctioned games, including 34 bowl games, and have finished in the top 25 of the national polls 27 times. Wisconsin is one of 26 college football programs to win 700 or more games. Since 1993, the Badgers have appeared in 27 bowl games in 29 seasons and won at least a share of the conference championship six times.

Seasons

References

Wisconsin
Wisconsin Badgers football seasons
Wisconsin Badgers football seasons